Jean-Pierre Büchler (6 July 1908 – 7 September 1993) was a Luxembourgian politician.

1908 births
1993 deaths
People from Echternach
Luxembourgian politicians
Ministers for Agriculture of Luxembourg

He was an agronomist by profession. A member of the Christian Social People's Party, from 1964 to 1969 he was Secretary of State in the Agriculture and Wine-growing Ministry, in the Werner-Cravatte government. From 1969 to 1972 he was Minister for Agriculture, Wine-growing, and Public Works, and from 1972 to 1974 was Minister for Public Works, Family, Social Housing and Social Solidarity in the second Werner-Schaus government. 

From 1974 to 1978 he was a member of the Chamber of Deputies. 

In Luxembourg City, the bridge over the railway from the Place de la Gare to Bonnevoie is named after him.